M. robustum  may refer to:
 Megaphobema robustum, the Colombian giant tarantula or Colombian giant redleg, a spider species found in the tropical rainforests of Colombia and Brazil
 Moxostoma robustum, the robust redhorse or smallfin redhorse, a freshwater fish species of the eastern United States